Nepal Investment Bank Limited is one of the leading commercial banks of Nepal.Previously known as Nepal Indosuez Bank Ltd., the bank was established in 1986 as a joint venture between Nepalese and Credit Agricole Indosuez.The Nepalese investors bought all the shares of French company i.e. 50% in 2001. It has 86 branches, 16 Extension Counters, 110 ATM outlets, 10 Revenue Collection offices, scattered throughout the country.

External links
 Official Website

References

Banks of Nepal
Banks established in 1986
1986 establishments in Nepal